Miika Koivisto (born 20 July 1990) is a Finnish professional ice hockey defenceman who is currently playing for the Växjö Lakers of the Swedish Hockey League SHL).

Playing career
Koivisto made his professional debut in the Finnish SM-liiga, playing with KalPa during the 2012–13 SM-liiga season.

After six seasons in the Liiga, Koivisto attracted interest abroad and agreed to a one-year contract as a free agent with Russian outfit, HC Dynamo Moscow of the Kontinental Hockey League (KHL), on May 4, 2018.

Koivisto played a lone season with Dynamo before moving to the Swiss National League (NL), agreeing to a one-year contract SC Bern on 11 June 2019. On November 3, 2019, SC Bern released Koivisto who put up only 2 assists and struggled defensively in 15 games with the team. He was signed the following day to commence a two-year deal with Swedish outfit, Växjö Lakers of the SHL.

Career statistics

Regular season and playoffs

International

Awards and honours

References

External links

1990 births
Living people
SC Bern players
HC Dynamo Moscow players
Finnish ice hockey defencemen
Mikkelin Jukurit players
KalPa players
KeuPa HT players
Lukko players
Ice hockey players at the 2018 Winter Olympics
Olympic ice hockey players of Finland
Oulun Kärpät players
Vaasan Sport players
Växjö Lakers players
People from Vaasa